Nealyda neopisoniae is a moth of the family Gelechiidae. It was described by Clarke in 1946. It is found in Cuba.

The wingspan is 6–8 mm. The extreme base of the forewings is blackish fuscous with minute white irrorations, while the remainder to one-third is pale fawn. From the basal third to the middle and again at the apical third are bands of dark golden brown separated by a fascia of pale fawn. In the center of this fascia 
is a blackish fuscous blotch with minute white irrorations and there is a blackish fuscous dorsal tuft at the center and the apical fourth of wing. The hindwings are very dark fuscous.

The larvae feed on Pisonia aculeata.

References

Moths described in 1946
Nealyda
Endemic fauna of Cuba